The Herborn Academy was a Calvinist institution of higher learning in Herborn from 1584 to 1817. The Academy was a centre of encyclopaedic Ramism and the birthplace of both covenant theology and pansophism. Its faculty of theology continues as the Theological Seminary of the Evangelical Church of Hesse and Nassau. The institution held the principle that every theory has to be functional in practical use, therefore it has to be didactic (i.e. morally instructive).

History 

In 1584 Count John VI of Nassau-Dillenburg founded the Academia Nassauensis as a post-secondary institution. He established it upon the request of his brother William the Silent, Prince of Orange in the year of the latter's death. The sovereign granted the students two warm meals and three liters of small beer per day. The Academy (Paedagogium) was originally located in the Herborn Castle. In 1588 Johann purchased the old town hall and, after expanding it, gave it over for the Academy’s use. This academy, which later took on a distinctively Calvinist cast, was further augmented with four faculties much like a conventional university. It quickly became one of the most important educational locations of the Calvinist-Reformed movement in Europe, becoming well-known as a centre of encyclopaedic Ramism and as the birthplace of covenant theology and pansophism.

Despite repeated efforts and the undisputed quality of the teaching, Herborn Academy was never given the imperial authorization to designate itself a university, largely because it was a Calvinist foundation. As a result, the school never possessed the authority to grant doctorates.

During the period 1594 to 1599/1600 and 1606 to 1609, the Academy moved from Herborn to Siegen, where it was accommodated in the buildings of the lower castle.

Johannes Piscator published a Reformed translation of the Bible at Herborn from 1602 to 1604.

In the first heyday, which lasted until 1626, over 300 students were enrolled in Herborn; for example about 400 in 1603. After 1626 the numbers fell sharply before reaching a second peak from 1685 to 1725. After that point average enrollment in Herborn numbered only about 100. A strong fluctuation in enrollment was the common story in Herborn: at one time in 1745 there were fewer than five students in the town. From its founding in 1584 until its closure in 1817, about 5700 students in total from across Europe studied at the academy. Many came from Switzerland, Bohemia, Moravia, Hungary or Scotland. 1000 came from Herborn itself.

Closure 
On 17 December 1811 Napoleon issued a decree for the Duchy of Berg, to which Herborn had been annexed in 1806, to establish a state university in Düsseldorf and to close the Herborn Academy in its favor. After the end of Napoleonic rule, this directive was not overturned and even with the creation of the Duchy of Nassau in 1817, the Academy was not restored. The Academy was abolished in 1817 with only the theological faculty continuing as a theological seminary.

The successor of the Academy, the Theological Seminary of the Evangelical Church of Hesse and Nassau (EKHN), is now located in Herborn Castle. The original buildings are currently used as a hotel and restaurant.

Faculty

Graduates
 Johannes Buxtorf (1564 – 1629), Hebraist
 Philipp Ludwig II, Count of Hanau-Münzenberg (1576 – 1612)
 Albert of Hanau-Münzenberg (1579 – 1635), Rector of the University of Heidelberg
 Daniel Strejc (1592 - 1669), Moravian minister, son-in-law of John Amos Comenius  
 John VIII, Count of Nassau-Siegen (1583 - 1638)
 Johann Heinrich Alting (1583 – 1644), chair of theology at Groningen University
 Ludwig Crocius, (1586 – 1653), Calvinist minister.
 Louis Henry, Prince of Nassau-Dillenburg (1594 - 1662)
 John Amos Comenius, enrolled 1611–1613, "father of modern education"
 Wilhelm von Curti (Sir William Curtius) FRS (1599 - 1678)
 Samuel Hartlib, (c. 1600 – 1662), polymath, the "Great Intelligencer of Europe"
 Johann Heinrich Bisterfeld (1605 – 1655) philosopher, logician and encyclopaedic writer
 Ludwig von Siegen (1609 – c. 1680 ?), inventor of mezzotint
 Johann Just Winckelmann (1620 –  1699) writer, historian
 Henry, Prince of Nassau-Dillenburg (1641 - 1701)
 Friedrich Ludwig Abresch (1699 - 1782), philologist 
 Johann Egidius Hecker (1726-1773), reformed pastor 18th century Pennsylvania
 Philip William Otterbein (1726 – 1813), U.S. clergyman, founder of the United Brethren in Christ
 Andreas Balzar (1769 - 1797), robber
 Johann Friedrich Benzenberg (1777 – 1846), astronomer, geologist, and physicist
 Adolph Diesterweg (1790 - 1866), educational reformer
 Theodor Fliedner (1800 – 1864), minister, founder of Lutheran deaconess training

Notes

References 
 Gottfried Zedler, Hans Sommer. Die Matrikel der Hohen Schule und des Paedagogikums zu Herborn. In: Veröffentlichungen der Historischen Kommission für Nassau. Band 5, Wiesbaden 1908.
 Carl Heiler. Die Matrikel der Hohen Schule zu Herborn, 1725–1817 / rekonstruiert von Carl Heiler. In: Nassauische Annalen. 55, 1935.
 Gerhard Menk. Die Hohe Schule Herborn in ihrer Frühzeit (1584–1660). Ein Beitrag zum Hochschulwesen des deutschen Kalvinismus im Zeitalter der Gegenreformation. Historische Kommission für Nassau, Wiesbaden 1981,  und .
 Johann Hermann Steubing. Geschichte der Hohen Schule Herborn. Die Wielandschmiede, Kreuztal 1984 (= Hadamar 1823).
 J. Wienecke (Hrsg.): Von der Hohen Schule zum Theologischen Seminar Herborn: 1584–1984: Festschrift zur 400-Jahrfeier. Herborn 1984.
 Hans Haering. Die Spätzeit der Hohen Schule zu Herborn (1742–1817): zwischen Orthodoxie und Aufklärung. In: Europäische Hochschulschriften: Reihe 3, Geschichte und ihre Hilfswissenschaften, 615. Lang, Frankfurt am Main 2003, .
 Dieter Wessinghage. Die Hohe Schule zu Herborn und ihre Medizinische Fakultät. Schattauer, Stuttgart, New York 2003, .
 Wilhelm A. Eckhardt, Gerhard Menk: Christian Wolff und die hessischen Universitäten. In: Beiträge zur hessischen Geschichte. Band 18, Trautvetter und Fischer, Marburg an der Lahn 2004, .

Educational institutions established in the 1580s
Defunct universities and colleges in Germany
1584 establishments in the Holy Roman Empire
1817 disestablishments in Europe
Educational institutions disestablished in the 19th century